Cindy Robinson is an American voice actress who voices in animations and video games. Some of her major roles are Makoto Nanaya and Gii from the Blazblue series, Betty Boop in commercials, Queen Beryl in Sailor Moon, Chitose Nanbu in Ah My Buddha, Kukaku Shiba, Miyako Shiba, Jinta Hanakari (kid) and Kiyone Kotetsu in Bleach, Zola in the Blue Dragon series, Madeline Hatter in "Ever After High" Minerva and Hinoka in Fire Emblem. She also makes an uncredited appearance as the voice of the Purge Emergency Broadcast System in The Purge franchise.
 

Robinson is best known for her role as Amy Rose in the Sonic the Hedgehog franchise since 2010.

Personal life
On April 29, 2022, Robinson married voice actor Christopher Corey Smith.

Filmography

Anime

Animation

Films

Television

Dubbing of foreign shows in English

Video games

Theatre

References

Bibliography

External links
 
 
 
 Cindy Robinson at the CrystalAcids Anime Voice Actor Database
 

Living people
American video game actresses
American voice actresses
Year of birth missing (living people)
20th-century American actresses
21st-century American actresses